Raymon Sanders (born October 1, 1935 in Saint Johns, Kentucky and died on October 13, 2019) was an American Country Music artist. Between 1960 and 1980, he charted fourteen times on the Hot Country Songs charts with singles released by Liberty, Imperial and United Artists labels. He also sang backing vocals for Ray Price.

Background
Sanders was originally a disc jockey in Elizabethtown, Kentucky and later a performer at the Lincoln Jamboree and Renfro Valley Barn Dance. He recorded a few rockabilly songs in 1957 under the name Curly Sanders before making his Grand Ole Opry debut in 1959. A year later, he signed with Liberty, reaching #18 on the country charts with "A World So Full of Love" and #20 with "Lonelyville". In 1968, Sanders won Top New Male Vocalist at the Academy of Country Music.

Sanders is also credited with putting singer Ron Lowry in touch with Gene Autry who signed him to his Republic label. Lowry would go on to have a hit with "Marry Me".

Career
He moved to Imperial Records in 1969, reaching number 22 with "Beer Drinkin' Music", and then to United Artists. By 1977, he was working in Riverside, California as a house act for a club called White Sands. Sanders also appeared on 5 episodes of Hee Haw as a background singer in 1971 and 1972.

Death
Ray died October 13, 2019.

Discography

Singles

References

External links

1935 births
2019 deaths
American country singer-songwriters
American male singer-songwriters
Country musicians from Kentucky
United Artists Records artists
Liberty Records artists
People from McCracken County, Kentucky
Singer-songwriters from Kentucky